Kossar's Bialys (Kossar's Bialystoker Kuchen Bakery) located at 367 Grand Street (and Essex Street), on the Lower East Side in Manhattan, New York City, is the oldest bialy bakery in the United States.

Background

The bialy gets its name from the "Bialystoker Kuchen" of Białystok, in present-day Poland. Polish Jewish bakers who arrived in New York City in the late 19th century and early 20th century made an industry out of their recipe for the mainstay bread rolls baked in every household.

History
Kossar's Bialys, originally known as Mirsky and Kossar's  when Isadore Mirsky and Morris Kossar founded it in 1936, is one of the few remnants of what was once its own industry in New York City with its own union association, the Bialy Bakers Association, Inc.

Originally located on Clinton Street in Manhattan's Lower East Side, Kossar's Bialys moved to its current location at Grand and Essex Streets in the early 1960s after a union dispute and subsequent fire destroyed the building.

Juda Engelmayer, Debra Engelmayer, Daniel Cohen, and Malki Cohen purchased the bakery from Morris Kossar's son-in-law and daughter, Daniel and Gloria Kossar Scheinin in 1998.

In 2013, Evan Giniger and David Zablocki purchased the bakery from the Engelmayers and Cohens. After the sale, the new owners made a number of upgrades and changes to the store, including expanding the menu and making the decision to no longer operate as a kosher establishment.

In popular culture
Kossar's Bialys was the starting point for former New York Times food critic Mimi Sheraton's research for her 2002 book, The Bialy Eaters: The Story of a Bread and a Lost World.

Kossar's Bialys is on the Lower East Side and Lower Manhattan tour circuit.

See also
 Bialystoker Synagogue

References

External links
 Official website

Lower East Side
Jews and Judaism in Manhattan
Restaurants in Manhattan
Grand Street (Manhattan)
Bakeries of the United States
Restaurants established in 1936
Polish-Jewish culture in New York City
Russian-Jewish culture in New York City
Ukrainian-Jewish culture in New York City